Carlos Berg or Friedrich Wilhelm Karl Berg (21 March 1843, Courland – 19 January 1902 Buenos Aires) was an Argentinian naturalist and entomologist of Latvian and Baltic German origin.

Having worked a few years in trade, he moved to Riga in 1865 and became curator of the entomological department of the Riga Museum, and then at the Riga Technical University.

In 1873, he was invited  by Hermann Burmeister (1807–1892), director of the Museum of Buenos Aires, to join him in Argentina. As early as 1874, Berg began an expedition to Patagonia to collect specimens for the museum. This first collecting trip was followed by others through Argentina, also in Chile and Uruguay.

Apart from a period of two years from 1890 to 1892, spent at the Museo Nacional in Montevideo, he was based in Buenos Aires. He replaced Burmeister as the head of the museum in 1892.

His first specialty was entomology, but he was also dedicated to paleontology and the study of vertebrates. Amongst his many other achievements, he described Cactoblastis cactorum, the cactus moth.

Berg was a fellow of the Entomological Society of London and a corresponding member of the Zoological Society of London.

Works

1875  Lepidópteros patagónicos. Observados en el viage de 1874 Acta Acad. Nac. Cordova, 1 (4): 63-102, (7): 155-158 Suplemento a la descripción de los lepidópteros patagónicos
1875 Patagonische Lepidopteren beobachtet auf einer Reise im Jahre 1874 Bull. Soc. Imp. Nat. Moscou 49 (4) : 191-247 
1879: Hemiptera argentina enumeravit speciesque novas descripsit Carolus Berg Bonariae,ex typographiae P.E. Coni
1877 Contribución al estudio de la fauna entomológica de Patagonia An. Soc. Cient. Argent. 4 (2): 87-102, : 199-211 
1877 Beiträge zu den Lepidoptoren Patagoniens Bull. Soc. imp. Nat. Moscou 52 (3) : 1-22 
1877 Estudios Lepidopterológicus acerce de la fauna Argentina y oriental An. Soc. cient. Argent. 3 : 228-242, pl. [1] 
1877 Descriptions de deux nouveaux Lépidoptères de la famille des Arctiadae Ann. Soc. Ent. Fr. (5) 7 : 189-194 
1880 :Observaciones acerca de la Familia Hyponomeutidae. Anales de la Sociedad Cientifica Argentina. 1880;10:99–109.
1885: Lepidoptera Nova, Faunae reipublicae Argentinae et Uruguayensis An. Soc. cient. argent. 19 : 266-285 
1889 : Substitucion de nombres genericos. III. Comm. Mus. Nac. Buenos Aires, 1 : 77-80.
1896 : Batraccios Argentinos.
1898 : Contribuciones... Fauna Erpetologica Argentina.

See also
 :Category:Taxa named by Carlos Berg

References

Sources
 Anonym 1902  [Berg, F. W. K.] Entomologist's Monthly Magazine (3), London 38:114	
 Gallardo, A. 1897  [Berg, F. W. K.] An. Soc. Cient. Argent., Buenos Aires 43 : 274-279, Portrait
 Osborn, H. 1937 Fragments of Entomological History Including Some Personal Recollections of Men and Events Columbus, Ohio, Published by the Author 1 : 1-394, 47		
 Groll, E. K. (Hrsg.): Biografien der Entomologen der Welt : Datenbank. Version 4.15 : Senckenberg Deutsches Entomologisches Institut, 2010 Berg, Friedrich Wilhelm Karl

External links
 Works by Berg at BHL

Entomologists from the Russian Empire
1902 deaths
1843 births
Baltic German people from the Russian Empire
Emigrants from the Russian Empire to Argentina
People from Tukums
Academic staff of Riga Technical University